Stroll and Roll (stylized as STROLL AND ROLL) is the twentieth studio album by Japanese alternative rock band The Pillows. It was released on April 6, 2016.

Track listing

References 

http://pillows.jp/s/disco/stroll-and-roll/

The Pillows albums
2016 albums